In 2018, Kent County Cricket Club competed in Division Two of the County Championship, the Royal London One-Day Cup and the 2018 t20 Blast. The county finished second in Division Two of the Championship and were promoted to Division One for the 2019 season. They reached the final of the One-Day Cup. losing to Hampshire at Lord's, and the quarter-final stage of the t20 Blast. In addition, before the start of the English cricket season, Kent competed in the 2017–18 Regional Super50, the List A competition of the West Indies domestic season, reaching the semi-final stage. This was the second time that Kent have competed in the competition, having played in the 2016–17 competition.

The season was the second in charge for head coach, and former player, Matthew Walker and saw the arrival of new assistant coach, former South African fast-bowler Allan Donald. Donald had been expected to join the county at the start of the  2017 season but was denied a work permit as he did not, at the time, hold a suitable coaching qualification. Former Kent and England wicket-keeper Paul Downton was appointed as Director of Cricket in January. Downton, who played for Kent between 1977 and 1979, was the managing director of the England and Wales Cricket Board from February 2014 until April 2015.

Sam Billings was the club captain for the first time, having replaced Sam Northeast in January 2018. Behind the scenes, chief executive Jamie Clifford departed the club in February 2018 to take up a position at MCC whilst the chairman of the Cricket Committee, former player Graham Johnson, did not seek re-election. Clifford's interim replacement, Ben Green, had previously worked at the ECB, Surrey and at the All England Club at Wimbledon. In November Simon Storey, who had been Chief Executive of Derbyshire County Cricket Club since 2012, was recruited in the role on a permanent basis, with Green initially taking on the role of Chief Operating Officer before leaving the club the following month.

At the end of the season Joe Denly was voted Players' Player of the Year at the Professional Cricketers' Association awards, beating teammate Matt Henry and Surrey batsman Rory Burns. He was also named Vitality Blast Player of the Year player of the year and Royal London One-Day Cup Player of the Year, as well as being included in the Team of the Year.

Squad

Departures
Adam Ball, Hugh Bernard and Charlie Hartley were released by Kent at the end of the 2017 season. Matt Coles also left his home county to join county champions Essex in October 2017.

Sam Northeast, who had been club captain for the previous two seasons, left to join Hampshire in February. Northeast had been given permission to speak to other counties after having been replaced as captain in January by Sam Billings. Northeast declined to sign an extended contract with Kent and would have been out of contract at the end of the 2018 season. Kent were unwilling to keep Northeast as captain in the last year of his contract and relations between the two sides broke down, with Kent reluctantly allowing Northeast permission to speak to other sides.

During July all-rounder Will Gidman announced that he would retire as a player at the end of the season with a view to moving into coaching. He had deputised as Kent's Second XI coach whilst Min Patel was working with the England under-19 side. On 17 September, off-spinner James Tredwell announced his retirement from cricket after an 18-year career, having made his debut for Kent in 2000. Tredwell represented England in two Tests, 45 One Day Internationals and 17 T20 Internationals. His last competitive appearances for Kent were during the Regional Super50 in Antigua and he had been suffering from a shoulder injury for the whole of the domestic season. The following day, Kent announced that Matt Hunn was to leave the county to pursue a career outside of cricket once his contract expired at the end of the season after five years as a professional.

Arrivals
South African international Heino Kuhn signed a Kolpak contract with Kent on 7 March, subject to him obtaining a visa. Kuhn, a wicket-keeper batsman, has played four Test matches for South Africa and appeared in seven Twenty20 internationals for his home country. Later the same month the county announced the signing of New Zealand international bowler Matt Henry as their overseas player for the first half of the season. He was originally available for the first seven County Championship matches of the season and the Royal London One-Day Cup competition. After performing well and taking 49 Championship wickets, Henry agreed to return to the county for the final five matches of the season in August and September. He was awarded his county cap during his first spell at Canterbury. Seam bowler Harry Podmore was signed to what was reported to be a three-year contract at the start of April, adding to the depth of Kent's bowling attack.

Australian all-rounder Marcus Stoinis and New Zealand bowler Adam Milne were both signed in March to play in the T20 Blast. Milne had played for the team in 2017 in both the T20 competition and the County Championship whilst Stoinis had played five Second XI matches for Kent in 2012 whilst playing league cricket at Peterborough. Milne was available for the entire competition with Stoinis was available for Kent's final nine matches in the competition.

In May Kent added West Indian T20 international captain Carlos Brathwaite to their squad for the first four matches of the T20 Blast, filling the second overseas player spot before the arrival of Stoinis. Brathwaite credited the influence of Kent captain Sam Billings, who he has played alongside in both the Big Bash League and Indian Premier League, in persuading him to sign for the county. On 13 July, after playing three matches, it was announced that Brathwaite had extended his stay for a fifth match, thus filling the second overseas player slot until the arrival of Stoinis.

In September Kent announced the signing of 24 year-old seam bowler Matt Milnes from Nottinghamshire on a three-year deal beginning at the start of the 2019 season. Milnes had played only eight first-class matches, making his Nottinghamshire debut in June, and previously having played for Durham MCCU. On 1 October Kent announced another signing for the 2019 season with Dutch international left-arm fast bowler Fred Klaassen joining on a two-year contract.

Squad list
 Ages given as of the first day of the 2018 County Championship season, 13 April 2018.

Regional Super50
Kent competed in the 2017–18 Regional Super50, a List A tournament that is part of the West Indian domestic season, after accepting an invitation from the West Indies Cricket Board. This was the second consecutive year that the county competed in the competition which ran from 30 January to 24 February. In the absence of club captain Sam Billings who was with the England cricket team in Australia and New Zealand, the side was captained by Joe Denly and, in Denly's absence at the end of the tour, Will Gidman. Head coach Matt Walker was also working with the England T20 team and assistant coach Allan Donald and Second XI coach Min Patel led the tour.

Kent were drawn in Group B and played two matches against each of the other teams in the group: Guyana, Jamaica, Leeward Islands and the United States. All of the county's matches took place on Antigua. After a loss against Guyana in their opening fixture, good team bowling performances and half centuries from Alex Blake and, in the next match, Zak Crawley, saw Kent beat both Jamaica and the Leeward Islands. Crawley's score of 99 not out was his highest List A score in only his fourth match, with the match ending in controversial circumstances with the opposing Leeward Islands bowling wide balls in what was seen by some as an attempt to deny Crawley the opportunity to reach his century.

In the following match Joe Denly's score of 96 and three wickets for Adam Riley led Kent to victory over the United States before a fine bowling performance, including career best figures of 4/20 from Will Gidman, allowed Kent to dismiss Guyana for 158 and earn a bonus point victory. A loss despite an unbeaten century from Daniel Bell-Drummond, who added 135 runs with Adam Rouse for the fifth wicket, in a close game against Jamaica followed before Kent defeated the US in a low scoring game. A win against the Leeward Islands in the final match of the group stage featured half-centuries from Bell-Drummond and Sean Dickson and four wickets from Adam Riley. The win, in a rain affected match which saw the Leewards being set 40 runs to win from seven balls after a rain delay in their innings reduced the number of overs allowed to 42, saw Kent qualify for the semi-finals, finishing second in the group behind Guyana.

The semi-final was also affected by rain. Barbados scored 263/3 batting first, with West Indian international Kraigg Brathwaite scoring an unbeaten century. Kent's reply was interrupted by rain on four occasions and the innings was eventually restricted to 43 overs, leaving 37 runs needed from 15 balls after the final rain delay. Despite a half-century from Sean Dickson and a 64 run partnership for the fourth wicket between Dickson and Adam Rouse, Kent could only score 216/8, losing by 13 runs to the defending champions in the competition who were described as "talented" and as "probably the strongest side in the Caribbean".

Group B
Kent finished in second place in group B behind Guyana. They qualified for the semi-final stage of the qualification.

Matches

Semi-final

County Championship
Kent finished second in Division Two of the County Championship and were promoted to Division One for the 2019 season. They won 10 matches, which was more wins than any other team in the division, drew one and lost three, but were beaten in their final match of the season by Warwickshire who won the division as a result. The two teams had started the final match equal on points.

The county played 14 Championship matches in 2018, seven at home and seven at away grounds. Kent's opening fixture was at home against Gloucestershire, starting on 13 April at the St Lawrence Ground. Six of the seven home matches were scheduled to take place at the St Lawrence Ground with one match, against Warwickshire in June, scheduled to take place at the Nevill Ground in Tunbridge Wells. This match was confirmed in February after a pre-season inspection of the ground, subject to another inspection before the start of the season. Kent's match at Tunbridge Wells in 2017 almost had to be moved to another ground due to concerns over the maintenance of the ground by Tunbridge Wells Borough Council who own the site.

Joe Denly was named as official vice-captain of the side in March and captained the side at the start of the season, while club captain Sam Billings was playing in the 2018 Indian Premier League.

Division Two

Matches

Other first-class matches
Kent began the 2018 English cricket season with a three-day match against Oxford MCC University on 1 April. They played a four-day match against the touring Pakistanis on the same ground at the end of the month. Both matches were draws, each having been hit by poor weather.

Only 33 overs were possible during the match against Oxford MCCU. A wet outfield at the St Lawrence Ground delayed the start of the match but play was possible after lunch on day one with Kent scoring 100/3. Bad light stopped any play after tea on day one and heavy overnight rain made the outfield impossible to play on during days two or three of the match. Joe Denly captained the side for the first time in a home match, becoming the first Kent player born in Canterbury to captain the side in a match in the city.

The match against Pakistan was also drawn after being disrupted by the weather. After bowling out the Pakistanis for 168 in overcast conditions and reaching 39/1 on the first day of the match, Kent were unable to bat on either the second or third days due to a combination of bad light and persistent rain. Further play was only possible on the afternoon of the final day, with Kent scoring 209/4 from 64 overs before the match was drawn. Joe Denly scored Kent's first century of the season, making an unbeaten 113, whilst Will Gidman took 5/47 during Pakistan's innings.

Royal London One-Day Cup
Kent played in the South group of the 2018 Royal London One-Day Cup, finishing third in the group and qualifying for the quarter-final stage of the competition. They played eight matches in the group stage of the competition, playing once against each of the other teams in the group. Four home matches were split between the St Lawrence Ground and the County Cricket Ground, Beckenham, each of which staged two matches.

South group

Matches

Quarter-final

Semi-final

Final

Vitality Blast
Kent played in the South group of the 2018 Vitality Blast. They played 14 matches, playing each of the other counties in the group at least once. Seven matches during the group stages were played at home grounds, five at the St Lawrence Ground and two at the County Cricket Ground, Beckenham. The county finished second in the group and played a home quarter-final match against Lancashire, losing by six wickets in a repeat of the 2015 quarter-final result between the two teams.

South group

Matches

Quarter-final

Statistics

Batting

Source: Cricinfo

Source: CricInfo

Source: CricInfo

Bowling

Source: CricInfo

Source: CricInfo

Source: CricInfo

References

External links
Kent home at ESPN cricinfo
Kent County Cricket Club official site

2018
2018 in English cricket